Gandhi Bhavan is the headquarters of the Indian National Congress Party in Nampally,  Hyderabad, Telangana.  It is situated near Exhibition Grounds, Nampally. The place is very commonly used as a landmark in Hyderabad. Mr. Khan Bahadur Abdul Karim Babukhan, father of Mr. Bashiruddin Babukhan & Narala Saikiran Mudiraj , had constructed Gandhi Bhavan some 50 years ago and donated to congress party.

References

External links 
 Location on Wikimapia

Buildings and structures in Hyderabad, India
Indian National Congress